Yasmine Gooneratne (born 1935) is a Sri Lankan poet, short story writer, university professor and essayist. She is recognised in Sri Lanka, Australia and throughout Europe and the U.S.A., due to her substantial creative and critical publications in the field of English and post-colonial literature. Currently, she resides in Sri Lanka.

Gooneratne was educated at the  University of Ceylon and Cambridge University. She is an Emeritus Professor, having held a personal chair in English as a Professor at Macquarie University which is situated in Sydney, New South Wales.

Yasmine Gooneratne was awarded Australia’s highest national honour, The Order Of Australia, in 1990, for her services to Education  and Literature.

She was also awarded the Raja Rao Award in 2001, for ‘Outstanding Contribution To The Literature and Culture Of The South Asian Diaspora.’ This award was presented by the Samvad India Foundation and Jawarharlal Nehru University, New Delhi.

She was also honoured with Sri Lanka’s Sahithyarathna Award for a lifetime’s achievement in Literature at The State Literary Festival in 2008. This Award is described as ‘The Highest Honour bestowed by the State of Sri Lanka’, and was conferred on Yasmine Gooneratne ‘For Her Immense Contribution To The Field Of English Literature.’

Yasmine Gooneratne has been a Patron of Sri Lanka’s premier literary festival, The Galle Literary Festival - later named ‘The Fairway Galle Literary Festival’ - from its inception.

Biography 
Yasmine Gooneratne married a Sri Lankan physician, Dr. Brendon Gooneratne in 1962. They have two children.

She was appointed Officer of The Order of Australia in 1990 by the Australian government for her distinguished services to literature and education. In fact, she is the only Sri Lankan to have received this honour. She received a Ph.D for English literature from Cambridge University in 1962.

Her international scholarship and pioneering work in the study and appreciation of postcolonial literature was described as being recognized with "Macquarie University's first higher doctoral degree (D.Litt.), the Order of Australia, and the Samvad India Foundation's Raja Rao Award for Literature which acknowledges authors who deal with the South Asian Diaspora in their literary work." The Sunday Times of Sri Lanka wrote of Gooneratne:

Literature career 
Yasmine Gooneratne has been one of the leading contributors to the field of English literature in Sri Lanka, and Australia, as a creative writer, an academic and literary critic, and as a lecturer, particularly in the areas of eighteenth century literature, Jane Austen’s novels, and post-colonial literature.

Yasmine Gooneratne was the Founder and Director of the Centre for Post Colonial Literature and Language Studies at Macquarie University. She is the Patron of the JASA (Jane Austen Society of Australia), a position to which she was appointed in 1990.

Gooneratne founded the literary journal New Ceylon Writing in 1970, to publish the creative writing of Sri Lankan writers in English. 5 issues of this publication were printed between 1970 and 1983/4. These 5 printed issues were digitally scanned, called ‘The Quintet’, and made available as an open access resource on the New Ceylon Writing website, newceylonwriting.com, after the publication was brought online in 2016. Issues #6 and #7 are available on the website as digital documents.

Yasmine Gooneratne is also an acclaimed poet, with several collections of poetry published, including ‘The Lizard’s Cry’, ‘Word, Bird, Motif’, ‘6,000 Foot Death Dive’ and ‘Celebrations And Departures’.  Her poem, ‘Big Match 1983’, describes the situation caused by the Black July riots in Sri Lanka. The poem is based on real events that took place in 1983.

Gooneratne has written two academic books for Cambridge University Press, on Jane Austen and Alexander Pope. She has also published 16 books with themes of post-colonial cultural tensions, both in creative fiction and literary criticism. Her  first novel ’A Change of Skies’ (1991) won the 1991 Marjorie Barnard Literature Award for Fiction and was shortlisted for the 1991 Commonwealth Fiction Prize. Her second novel, ‘The Pleasures Of Conquest’, published in 1995/6, was listed for The Commonwealth Fiction Award. In 2008, she was nominated for the International Dublin Literary Award for her third novel ’The Sweet and Simple Kind’, and is to date the only Sri Lankan author to have been shortlisted for the Dublin IMPAC Award.

In 1999, Gooneratne co-wrote, with her husband, ‘This Inscrutable Englishman’, a historical biography of Sir John D’Oyly, a civil servant in British Colonial Sri Lanka.

Gooneratne also edited Stories from Sri Lanka and Poems from India, Sri Lanka, Malaysia and Singapore (1979), titles in the Writing in Asia Series published from 1966 to 1996. Her fourth novel, ‘Rannygazoo’, was released online in 2015, and is available on request.

Awards and recognition

In 1990, Yasmine Gooneratne was awarded The Order Of Australia for her services to Literature and Education.

In 2001, Yasmine Gooneratne was given the Raja Rao Award in India, for her contributions to the Literature and Culture of the South Asian Diaspora.

In 2008, Yasmine Gooneratne was given the Sahithyarathna Award in Sri Lanka.

In 2011, the prestigious Premchand Fellowship of Sahitya Akademi of India was conferred upon Yasmine Gooneratne.

References 

1935 births
Living people
Feminist writers
Sri Lankan poets
People from Colombo
Officers of the Order of Australia
Australian people of Sri Lankan descent
20th-century Sri Lankan writers
20th-century Sri Lankan women writers
21st-century Sri Lankan writers
21st-century Sri Lankan women writers
21st-century Australian women writers
21st-century Australian writers